This is a list of notable events in music that took place in the year 1944.

Specific locations
1944 in British music
1944 in Norwegian music

Specific genres
1944 in country music
1944 in jazz

Events
January 18 – The Metropolitan Opera House in New York City for the first time hosts a jazz concert; the performers are Louis Armstrong, Benny Goodman, Lionel Hampton, Artie Shaw, Roy Eldridge and Jack Teagarden.
February – The Leipzig Gewandhaus Orchestra loses its concert hall in an Allied air raid.
February 19 – The Billboard modifies its "Most Played Juke Box Records" chart to rank records (previously it had ranked songs, listing multiple records for each). The year-end "Top Disks" of 1944 will now be based on performance on the "Best Selling Retail Records" and "Most Played Juke Box Records" charts.
July 28 – Sir Henry Wood, aged 75, conducts his last Promenade Concert in London.
August 19 – Italian singers Lucia Mannucci and Virgilio Savona get married.
September 20 – Yehudi Menuhin gives the first British performance of Béla Bartók's Second Violin Concerto in Bedford, in the opening concert of a tour with the B.B.C. Orchestra conducted by Sir Adrian Boult.
 Autumn – Peggy Guggenheim's The Art of This Century gallery on Manhattan releases a 78 rpm 3-record album containing Paul Bowles' Sonata for Flute and Piano and Two Mexican Dances with a cover by Max Ernst.
October 25 – Florence Foster Jenkins gives a recital in Carnegie Hall.
November 11 – AFM strike ends when Columbia, Victor and NBC "throw in the sponge" and agree to terms.
December 15 – Glenn Miller is reported missing. The official explanation is that his plane went down somewhere over the English Channel, although many alternate theories have been suggested.
Singer Billy Murray retires to Long Island.
English contralto Kathleen Ferrier makes the first of her recordings of the aria "What is Life?" (Che farò) from Gluck's Orfeo ed Euridice which will rival sales by more popular singers over the next few years.
Czech Jewish composer Hans Krása's children's opera Brundibár is performed many times in Theresienstadt concentration camp, where on October 17 the composer is killed.
Flo Sandon's makes her stage debut, singing in a charity show.
Jo Stafford launches her solo career.
Frankie Laine cuts his first singles for the Beltone and Atlas labels.

Albums released
The Wayfaring Stranger – Burl Ives
 Going My Way – Bing Crosby
 Boogie Woogie In Blue – Harry Gibson

Top records

On August 1, 1942, a strike by the American Federation of Musicians ended all recording sessions. Record companies kept business going by releasing recordings from their vaults, but by mid-1943, alternate sources were running dry, as the strike continued. Decca was the first company to settle in September 1943, but RCA Victor and Columbia held on until November 11, 1944. It comes as no surprise that fifteen of the top twenty records of 1944 were released by Decca, with two more by Capitol, the second company to settle.

Beginning February 19, 1944, The Billboard modified its "Most Played Juke Box Records" chart to rank records (previously it had ranked songs, listing multiple records for each). The January 6, 1945 issue contained year-end top ten charts for "Best Selling Retail Records", "Most Played Juke Box Records" and "Top 10 Disks for 1944", the latter combining the scores of the former two charts. The chart below was compiled using Billboard's formula, but includes each record's full chart period, with weeks from 1943 and 1945 as needed. Details from "Most Played Juke Box Folk Records" (Hillbilly), "Harlem Hit Parade" (HHP) charts and the "American Folk Records" column late 1943-early 1944 were also considered. As always, numerical rankings are approximate.

Top race records

Popular hit records

Published popular music

 "Ac-cent-tchu-ate The Positive" words: Johnny Mercer, music: Harold Arlen
 "All of a Sudden My Heart Sings" w. (Eng) Harold Rome (Fr) Jean Marie Blanvillain m. Herpin
 "And Her Tears Flowed Like Wine" w. Joe Greene m. Stan Kenton & Charles Lawrence
 "As Long as There's Music" w. Sammy Cahn m. Jule Styne. Introduced in the film Step Lively by Frank Sinatra.
 "Bell Bottom Trousers" w.m. Moe Jaffe
 "The Boy Next Door" w.m. Hugh Martin & Ralph Blane
 "Candy" w. Mack David & Joan Whitney m. Alex Kramer
 "Can't Help Singing" w. E. Y. Harburg m. Jerome Kern
 "Dance with a Dolly" w.m. Terry Shand, Jimmy Van Eaton & David Kapp
 "Don't Explain" w. Billie Holiday m. Arthur Herzog Jr.
 "Don't Fence Me In" w.m. Cole Porter
 "Dream" w.m. Johnny Mercer
 "Fine Brown Frame" w.m. Guadalupe Cartiero & J. Mayo Williams
 "First Class Private Mary Brown" w.m. Frank Loesser
 "The Flaming Sword of Liberation" m. Glenn Miller
 "G.I. Jive" w.m. Johnny Mercer
 "Going My Way" w. Johnny Burke m. Jimmy Van Heusen
 "Have Yourself A Merry Little Christmas" w.m. Hugh Martin & Ralph Blane
 "A Hot Time in the Town Of Berlin" w. John De Vries m. Joe Bushkin
 "How Blue the Night" w. Harold Adamson m. Jimmy McHugh
 "How Little We Know" w. Johnny Mercer m. Hoagy Carmichael. Introduced by Lauren Bacall in the film To Have And Have Not.
 "I Begged Her" w. Sammy Cahn m. Jule Styne
 "I Didn't Know About You" w. Bob Russell m. Duke Ellington
 "I Dream of You (More Than You Dream I Do)" w.m. Marjorie Goetschius & Edna Osser
 "I Fall in Love Too Easily" w. Sammy Cahn m. Jule Styne
 "I Love You" w.m. Cole Porter
 "I'll Walk Alone" w. Sammy Cahn m. Jule Styne
 "I'm Beginning to See the Light" w.m. Duke Ellington, Don George, Johnny Hodges & Harry James
 "I'm Headin' For California" w.m. Glenn Miller & Artie Malvin
 "I'm Making Believe" w. Mack Gordon m. James V. Monaco
 "Into Each Life Some Rain Must Fall" w.m. Allan Roberts & Doris Fisher
 "It Could Happen to You" w. Johnny Burke m. Jimmy Van Heusen. Introduced by Dorothy Lamour and Fred MacMurray in the film And the Angels Sing
 "It's Love, Love, Love" w. Mack David m. Alex Kramer & Joan Whitney
 "Jealous Heart" w.m. Jenny Lou Carson
 "Keep a Sunbeam in Your Pocket" w.m. V. Guest & M. Sherwin from the film Bees in Paradise
 "Leave the Dishes in the Sink, Ma" w.m. Milton Berle, Gene Doyle & Spike Jones
 "Like Someone in Love" w. Johnny Burke m. Jimmy Van Heusen. Introduced by Dinah Shore in the film Belle of the Yukon.
 "A Little on the Lonely Side" w.m. Dick Robertson, Frank Weldon & James Cavanaugh
 "Long Ago (and Far Away)" w. Ira Gershwin m. Jerome Kern. Introduced by Martha Mears dubbing for Rita Hayworth in the film Cover Girl
 "Milkman, Keep Those Bottles Quiet" w.m. Don Raye & Gene De Paul
 "More and More" w. E. Y. Harburg m. Jerome Kern From the Universal film Can't Help Singing
 "My Dreams Are Getting Better All The Time" w. Mann Curtis m. Vic Mizzy
 "Nancy (With the Laughing Face)" w. Phil Silvers m. Jimmy Van Heusen
 "New York, New York" w. Betty Comden & Adolph Green m. Leonard Bernstein
 "Now I Know" w. Ted Koehler m. Harold Arlen
 "On the Atchison, Topeka and the Santa Fe" w. Johnny Mercer m. Harry Warren
 "One Meat Ball" w. Hy Zaret m. Lou Singer
 "Please Don't Say No" w. Ralph Freed m. Sammy Fain from the film Thrill of a Romance
 "Put It There Pal" w. Johnny Burke m. Jimmy Van Heusen
 "Rum and Coca-Cola" w.m. Morey Amsterdam, Paul Baron & Jeri Sullivan
 "Saturday Night" w. Sammy Cahn m. Jule Styne
 "Sentimental Journey" w. Bud Green m. Les Brown & Ben Homer
 "Seven-O-Five" m. Glenn Miller
 "Sleighride in July" w. Johnny Burke m. Jimmy Van Heusen. Introduced by Dinah Shore in the film Belle of the Yukon.
 "Someday (You'll Want Me to Want You)" w.m. Jimmie Hodges
 "Spring Will Be a Little Late This Year" w.m. Frank Loesser
 "Stella by Starlight" w. Ned Washington m. Victor Young
 "Swinging on a Star" w. Johnny Burke m. Jimmy Van Heusen
 "There Goes That Song Again" w. Sammy Cahn m. Jule Styne
 "There's A Fellow Waiting In Poughkeepsie" w. Johnny Mercer m. Harold Arlen
 "There's No You" w. Tom Adair m. Hal Hopper
 "This Heart of Mine" w. Arthur Freed m. Harry Warren
 "Till Then" w.m. Eddie Seiler, Sol Marcus & Guy Wood
 "Twilight Time" w.m. Buck Ram, Mortie Nevins & Artie Dunn
 "Umbriago" w.m. Irving Caesar & Jimmy Durante
 "You Always Hurt the One You Love" w.m. Allan Roberts & Doris Fisher
 "You Belong To My Heart" w. (Eng) Ray Gilbert m. Agustín Lara
 "You Can't Get That No More" w.m. Louis Jordan & Sam Theard
 "You're Nobody till Somebody Loves You" w.m. Russ Morgan, Larry Stock & James Cavanaugh

Classical music

Premieres

Compositions
George Antheil – Symphony No. 4
Samuel Barber –
Capricorn Concerto, Op. 21, for flute, oboe, trumpet, and string orchestra
Excursions, Op. 20, for piano
Symphony No. 2, Op. 19
Béla Bartók – Sonata for solo violin
Arnold Bax –
A Legend, tone poem, for orchestra
To Russia, for choir with baritone solo
Leonard Bernstein – Fancy Free (ballet)
John Cage –
A Book of Music, for two prepared pianos
Four Walls, for piano and voice
The Perilous Night, suite for prepared piano
Prelude for Meditation, for prepared piano
Root of an Unfocus, for prepared piano
Spontaneous Earth, for prepared piano
Triple-Paced No. 2, for prepared piano
The Unavailable Memory Of, for prepared piano
A Valentine Out of Season, for prepared piano
Julián Carrillo –
Himno a la paz, for two choirs and piano
Suite No. 4, for piano
Elliott Carter –
The Difference, for soprano, baritone, and piano
The Harmony of Morning, for SSAA choir and small orchestra
Holiday Overture
Carlos Chávez – La hija de Cólquide (ballet)
Aaron Copland – Appalachian Spring (ballet)
Henry Cowell –
Animal Magic of the Alaskan Esquimo, for band
Derwent and the Shining Sword, incidental music
Elegie for Hanya Holm, for piano
Manaunaun's Birthing, for orchestra
Hymn and Fuguing Tune No. 1, for band
Hymn and Fuguing Tune No. 2, for string orchestra
Hymn and Fuguing Tune No. 3, for orchestra
Hymn and Fuguing Tune No. 4, for soprano, alto, and bass recorders, woodwinds, and strings
Kansas Fiddler, for piano
Mountain Music, for piano
The Pasture, for voice and piano
Sonatina, for baritone, violin, and piano
George Crumb – Two Duos for flute and clarinet
David Diamond – Rounds
Ernő Dohnányi – Symphony No. 2
George Enescu – Piano Quartet No. 2 in D minor, Op. 30
John Fernström – Symphony No. 10
Vivian Fine – Concertante for Piano and Orchestra
Gerald Finzi – Farewell to Arms
Cecil Armstrong Gibbs – Westmoreland Symphony
Camargo Guarnieri – String Quartet No. 2
Alois Hába –
Milenci (The Lovers), song cycle for soprano and piano, Op. 57
Moravian Love-Songs (5), for mezzo-soprano with guitar or piano accompaniment, Op. 58
Sonata for chromatic harp, Op. 59
Sonata for diatonic harp, Op. 60
Suite, for quarter-tone trumpet and trombone, Op. 56
Paul Hindemith – Hérodiade, ballet, for orchestra
Vagn Holmboe – Symphony No. 5
Alan Hovhaness –
Armenian Rhapsody No. 1, Op. 45, for percussion and strings
Armenian Rhapsody No. 2, Op. 51, for string orchestra
Elibris, Op. 50, concerto for flute and strings
Khrimian Hairig, Op. 49, for trumpet and strings
Lousadzak, Op. 48, concerto for piano and strings
Mazert Nman Rehan ("Thy Hair is Like Basil Leaf"), Op. 38, for piano
Varak, Op. 47a, for violin and piano
Jacques Ibert
Trio, for violin, cello and harp
Petite suite en 15 images, for piano
Les Petites du quai aux fleurs, film score
Joseph Jongen – Concerto for Harp No. 1
Dmitry Kabalevsky –
Easy Pieces (24), Op. 39, for piano
Easy Variations, in D major (Toccata) and A minor, Op. 40, for piano
Preludes (24), Op. 38, for piano
Aram Khachaturian –
Anthem of the Armenian SSR, for orchestra
Choreographic Waltz, for piano
Russian Fantasy, for orchestra
Suite from Masquerade, for orchestra
Symphony No. 2, "The Bell" (second version)
Zoltán Kodály – Missa Brevis
Frank Martin – Petite symphonie concertante
Bohuslav Martinů –
Piano Quintet No. 2
Písničky na dvě stránky [Songs on Two Pages], for voice and piano
Sonata No. 3, for violin and piano
Symphony No. 3
Trio, for flute, cello, and piano
Olivier Messiaen – Vingt regards sur l'Enfant-Jésus, for piano
Darius Milhaud –
Air, Op. 242, for viola and orchestra
Le bal martiniquais, Op. 249, versions for orchestra and for two pianos
Borechou – Schema Israël (Bless Ye the Lord – O Hear, Israel), Op. 239, for cantor, chorus, and organ
Caïn et Abel, Op. 241, for reciter and orchestra
Jeux de printemps, Op. 243, ballet
La libération des Antilles, Op. 246, for voice and piano
La muse ménagère, Op. 245, for piano (also orchestrated)
Printemps lointain, Op. 253, for voice and piano
Sonata No. 1 "sur des thèmes inédits et anonymes de XVIIIe siècle", Op. 240, for viola and piano
Sonata No. 2, Op. 244, for viola and piano
Suite française, Op. 248, for band or for orchestra
Symphony No. 2, Op. 247
Harry Partch –
Yankee Doodle Fantasy
Two Settings from Joyce's Finnegans Wake
Francis Poulenc – Un soir de neige, for six-part choir
Sergei Prokofiev –
Adagio, for cello and piano, Op. 97bis
Cinderella, Op. 87, ballet, for orchestra
March in B-flat, Op. 99, for band
Piano Sonata No. 8 in B-flat major, Op. 84
Pieces (6) from Cinderella, Op. 102, for piano
Russian Folksongs (12), Op. 104, for voice and piano
Symphony No. 5, in B-flat major, Op. 100
Dmitri Shostakovich –
Trio for violin, cello and piano No. 2 E minor, Op. 67
String Quartet No. 2 in A major, Op. 68
Igor Stravinsky –
Babel, for choir
Elegy, for solo viola
Scherzo à la russe, for orchestra
Scènes de ballet, for orchestra
Stjepan Šulek – First Symphony
Michael Tippett –
Plebs Angelica, motet for double choir
The Weeping Babe, motet for soprano and SATB choir
Ralph Vaughan Williams – Oboe Concerto
Heitor Villa-Lobos –
Bachianas Brasileiras No. 8, for orchestra
String Quartet No. 8
Symphony No. 2 Asenção (Ascension), revised or completed
Symphony No. 6 – Sobre a linha das montanhas do Brasil (On the Outline of the Mountains of Brazil)
William Walton – Lai and Rondet de carol, for piano
Grace Williams – Sea Sketches

Film
Erich Korngold – Between Two Worlds (1944 film)
Sergei Prokofiev – Ivan the Terrible (1944 film)
David Raksin – Laura (1944 film)

Jazz

Musical theater
 Bloomer Girl Broadway production opened at the Shubert Theatre on October 5 and ran for 654 performances.
 Follow The Girls Broadway production opened at the New Century Theatre on April 8 and ran for 882 performances.
 Jenny Jones London production opened at the London Hippodrome on October 2 and ran for 153 performances
 Mexican Hayride Broadway production opened at the Winter Garden Theatre on January 28 and transferred to the Majestic Theatre on December 18 for a total run of 481 performances
 A Night In Venice (Johann Strauss II) London production opened at the Cambridge Theatre on May 25
 On the Town (Leonard Bernstein, Betty Comden and Adolph Green) – Broadway production opened at the Adelphi Theatre (New York) on December 28, transferred to the 44th Street Theatre on June 4, 1945, and transferred to the Martin Beck Theatre on July 30, 1945, for a total run of 462 performances.
 Seven Lively Arts Broadway production opened at the Ziegfeld Theatre on December 7 and ran for 183 performances
 Song Of Norway Broadway production opened at the Imperial Theatre on August 21 and transferred to the Broadway Theatre on April 15, 1946, for a total run of 860 performances
 Sweeter And Lower London production

Musical films
 Allergic to Love starring Noah Beery Jr., Martha O'Driscoll, David Bruce, Franklin Pangborn and Maxie Rosenbloom. Directed by Edward Lilley.
 And the Angels Sing starring Dorothy Lamour, Fred MacMurray and Betty Hutton. Directed by Claude Binyon.
 Babes on Swing Street starring Ann Blyth, Peggy Ryan and Andy Devine and featuring Marion Hutton and Freddie Slack & his Orchestra. Directed by Edward Lilley.
 Bees in Paradise released March 20 starring Arthur Askey, Anne Shelton, Ronald Shiner and Jean Kent
 Belle of the Yukon starring Randolph Scott, Gypsy Rose Lee, Dinah Shore and Bob Burns.
 Can't Help Singing starring Deanna Durbin, Robert Paige and Akim Tamiroff
 Carolina Blues starring Ann Miller and Kay Kyser & his band
 Champagne Charlie starring Tommy Trinder
 Cover Girl starring Rita Hayworth, Gene Kelly, Phil Silvers, Lee Bowman, Jinx Falkenburg, Otto Kruger and Eve Arden. Directed by Charles Vidor.
 Gharam Wa Intiqam, starring Asmahan
 Here Come the Waves starring Bing Crosby, Betty Hutton and Sonny Tufts.
 Hey, Rookie starring Ann Miller and Larry Parks
 Hollywood Canteen starring Jack Benny, Eddie Cantor, Joan Crawford, Bette Davis, Roy Rogers, Barbara Stanwyck and Jane Wyman and featuring The Andrews Sisters, Jimmy Dorsey & his Orchestra and Carmen Cavallaro & his Orchestra. Directed by Delmer Daves.
 Jam Session starring Ann Miller and featuring Louis Armstrong & his Orchestra, Alvino Rey & his Orchestra and Charlie Barnet & his Orchestra
 Knickerbocker Holiday starring Nelson Eddy and Charles Coburn
 Lady In The Dark starring Ginger Rogers and Ray Milland
 Lost in a Harem starring Bud Abbott, Lou Costello, Marilyn Maxwell and John Conte, and featuring Jimmy Dorsey & his Orchestra. Directed by Charles Reisner.
 Meet Me in St. Louis starring Judy Garland, Mary Astor, Tom Drake, Lucille Bremer and Margaret O'Brien. Directed by Vincente Minnelli.
 Meet Miss Bobby Sox starring Bob Crosby, Lynn Merrick and Louise Erickson and featuring Louis Jordan & His Tympany Five. Directed by Glenn Tryon.
 The Merry Monahans starring Donald O'Connor, Peggy Ryan, Jack Oakie, Rosemary DeCamp, Ann Blyth and Isabel Jewell
 Minstrel Man starring Benny Fields and Gladys George
 One Exciting Night starring Vera Lynn
 Pardon My Rhythm starring Gloria Jean, Patric Knowles and Mel Torme and featuring Bob Crosby & his Orchestra. Directed by Felix E. Feist.
 Rainbow Island starring Dorothy Lamour and Eddie Bracken
 Shine on Harvest Moon starring Ann Sheridan, Dennis Morgan and Jack Carson.
 Something for the Boys released November 1 starring Carmen Miranda, Phil Silvers, Vivian Blaine and Perry Como.
 Step Lively starring Frank Sinatra, Gloria DeHaven, George Murphy and Anne Jeffreys.
 Sweet and Low-Down starring Benny Goodman & his Orchestra, Linda Darnell, Jack Oakie and Lynn Bari
 Swing in the Saddle starring Jane Frazee, The Hoosier Hot Shots, Cousin Emmy and featuring The King Cole Trio and Jimmy Wakely & his Oklahoma Cowboys
 Take It Big starring Jack Haley, Harriet Hilliard, Mary Beth Hughes and Richard Lane and featuring Ozzie Nelson & his Orchestra. Directed by Frank McDonald.
Time Flies starring Tommy Handley and Evelyn Dall
 Two Girls and a Sailor starring June Allyson, Gloria DeHaven and Van Johnson
 You Can't Ration Love starring Betty Jane Rhodes and Johnny Johnston. Directed by Lester Fuller.

Births
January 2 – Péter Eötvös, Hungarian composer, conductor and teacher
January 3 – David Atherton, British conductor
January 6 – Alan Stivell, folk musician
January 9
Jimmy Page, guitarist (Led Zeppelin)
Scott Walker, singer (died 2019)
January 10 – Frank Sinatra, Jr., singer (died 2016)
January 12 – Cynthia Robinson, trumpeter and ad-lib vocalist (Sly and the Family Stone) (Graham Central Station) (died 2015)
January 16 – Jim Stafford, singer-songwriter and musician
January 17 – Françoise Hardy, singer
January 19 – Shelley Fabares, actress and singer
January 27 – Nick Mason, English rock drummer (Pink Floyd)
January 28 – John Tavener, composer (died 2013)
February 2 – Andrew Davis, conductor
February 3 – Trisha Noble, singer and actress
February 4 – Florence LaRue, American singer and actress (The 5th Dimension)
February 5 – Al Kooper, musician, songwriter and record producer (Blood, Sweat & Tears)
February 7 – Antoni Wit, Polish conductor and composer
February 10
Rufus Reid, American bassist and composer (The Thad Jones/Mel Lewis Orchestra)
Clifford T. Ward, singer-songwriter (died 2001)
February 12 – Moe Bandy, American singer and guitarist
February 15 – Mick Avory, drummer (The Kinks)
February 17 – Karl Jenkins, composer
February 20 – Lew Soloff, jazz trumpeter, composer and actor (Blood, Sweat & Tears)
February 23
Mike Maxfield, lead guitarist (The Dakotas)
Johnny Winter, blues guitarist, singer and producer (died 2014)
February 24
Nicky Hopkins, keyboard player and session musician (died 1994)
Paul Jones, R&B singer, actor and broadcaster
March 1
Mike d'Abo, vocalist (Manfred Mann)
Roger Daltrey, vocalist (The Who)
March 4 – Bobby Womack, singer-songwriter (died 2014)
March 6
Kiri Te Kanawa, operatic soprano
Mary Wilson, singer (The Supremes) (died 2021)
March 9 – Mark Lindsay, vocalist (Paul Revere & the Raiders)
March 17
Pattie Boyd, sometime wife and muse of both George Harrison and Eric Clapton
John Lill, pianist
John Sebastian, songwriter and harmonica player (The Lovin' Spoonful)
March 23
Michael Nyman, composer
Ric Ocasek, new wave singer-songwriter (The Cars) (died 2019)
March 26 – Diana Ross, singer
March 29 – Terry Jacks, singer-songwriter, producer and environmentalist
March 31 – Mick Ralphs, British rock guitarist and singer (Bad Company, Mott The Hoople)
April 3 – Tony Orlando, singer
April 5 – Crispian St. Peters, singer (died 2010)
April 6
Felicity Palmer, operatic mezzo-soprano
Michelle Phillips, actress and vocalist (The Mamas & the Papas)
April 12 – John Kay, singer-songwriter and guitarist (Steppenwolf)
April 13 – Brian Pendleton, original member of The Pretty Things (died 2001)
April 13 – Jack Casady, bass guitarist (Jefferson Airplane)
April 15 – Dave Edmunds, rock singer and guitarist
April 17 – Bobby Curtola, pop singer and teen idol (died 2016)
April 18 – Skip Spence, singer-songwriter (Moby Grape) (died 1999)
April 27 – Cuba Gooding Sr., lead singer (The Main Ingredient) (died 2017)
May 9 – Richie Furay, country musician and singer (Buffalo Springfield)
May 12 – James Purify, singer (died 2021)
May 14 – Gene Cornish, guitarist (The Rascals)
May 17 – Jesse Winchester, musician and songwriter
May 20
Joe Cocker, English singer (died 2014)
Boudewijn de Groot, Dutch singer
May 21 – Marcie Blane, singer
May 23 – Tiki Fulwood, American R&B/funk/jazz drummer (died 1979)
May 24 – Patti LaBelle, singer
May 26 – Verden Allen, British rock organist and singer (Mott The Hoople)
May 28
Gladys Knight, singer
Billy Vera, singer, actor and writer
June 2 – Marvin Hamlisch, songwriter and composer (died 2012)
June 6 – Edgar Froese, electronic music pioneer (Tangerine Dream)
June 7 – Clarence White (The Byrds), guitarist (Nashville West) (died 1973)
June 8 – Boz Scaggs, singer-songwriter
June 17 – Chris Spedding, guitarist and songwriter
June 21 – Ray Davies, singer-songwriter (The Kinks)
June 22 – Peter Asher, singer and record producer (Peter and Gordon)
June 23 – Rosetta Hightower, singer (died 2014)
June 24
Jeff Beck, rock guitarist (died 2023)
Arthur Brown, rock singer (The Crazy World of Arthur Brown)
Chris Wood, rock musician (Traffic) (died 1983)
June 26 – Arthur Doyle, American singer-songwriter, saxophonist and flautist (died 2014)
June 30 – Glenn Shorrock, singer-songwriter (Little River Band)
July 6 – Byron Berline, American fiddler (The Flying Burrito Brothers)
July 8
Jai Johanny Johanson, drummer (The Allman Brothers Band)
Michael Johnson, singer-songwriter and guitarist (died 2017)
July 22 – Rick Davies, keyboardist (Supertramp)
July 27 – Bobbie Gentry, singer-songwriter
August 2 – Jim Capaldi, drummer and singer-songwriter (Traffic) (died 2005)
August 3 – Nino Bravo, singer (died 1973)
August 12 – Larry Troutman, R&B musician (Zapp) (d.1999)
August 18 – Carl Wayne, vocalist (The Move) (died 2004)
August 19 – Eddy Raven, country musician
August 27 – Tim Bogert, bass guitarist (Vanilla Fudge) (died 2021)
September 1
Archie Bell, R&B singer-songwriter (Archie Bell & the Drells)
Leonard Slatkin, conductor (Detroit Symphony Orchestra)
September 3 – Gary Leeds (The Walker Brothers)
September 4 – Gene Parsons (The Byrds) (The Flying Burrito Brothers)
September 12 – Barry White, soul singer-songwriter and record producer (died 2003)
September 13 – Peter Cetera, vocalist (Chicago)
September 16
Winston Grennan, drummer (died 2000)
Betty Kelley (Martha and the Vandellas)
September 23 – Ivan Martin Jirous, poet and musician (The Plastic People of the Universe)
September 29
Tommy Boyce, songwriter (died 1994)
Mike Post, TV theme composer
October 1 – Barbara Parritt, (The Toys)
October 4 – Marlena Davis (The Orlons) (died 1993)
October 7 – Judee Sill, singer-songwriter (died 1979)
October 9
John Entwistle, bassist (The Who) (died 2002)
Nona Hendryx, singer-songwriter, author and actress
October 13 – Robert Lamm, keyboardist and singer-songwriter (Chicago)
October 16 – Patsy Watchorn, folk musician
October 19
George McCrae, soul and disco singer
Peter Tosh, reggae musician (died 1987)
October 24
Bettye Swann, soul singer
Ted Templeman, record producer
October 25 – Jon Anderson, lead singer (Yes)
October 26 – Jim McCann, folk musician
October 29 – Denny Laine, guitarist & singer (The Moody Blues), singer & multi-instrumentalist (Wings)
November 2 – Keith Emerson, keyboardist and composer (Emerson, Lake & Palmer) (died 2016)
November 8 – Bonnie Bramlett, singer (Delaney & Bonnie)
November 10 – Sir Tim Rice, lyricist
November 11 – Jennifer Bate, concert organist (died 2020)
November 12 – Booker T. Jones, musician, record producer, composer and arranger
November 17 – Gene Clark, singer-songwriter (The Byrds) (died 1991)
November 25 – Bev Bevan, drummer & vocalist (The Move) (Electric Light Orchestra), drummer (Black Sabbath)
November 26 – Jean Terrell, singer
November 28 – R. B. Greaves, singer
December 1 – John Densmore (The Doors)
December 3 – António Variações, Portuguese singer-songwriter (died 1984)
December 4 – Dennis Wilson (The Beach Boys) (died 1983)
Chris Hillman (The Byrds, The Flying Burrito Brothers, The Desert Rose Band)
December 6 – Jonathan King, singer, songwriter and record producer
December 7 – Daniel Chorzempa, organist
December 9
Shirley Brickley (The Orlons) (died 1977)
Neil Innes, singer-songwriter and comedian (died 2019)
December 11 – Brenda Lee, singer
December 12 – Rob Tyner, American singer-songwriter and bass player (MC5) (died 1991)
December 13 – Marti Webb, singer
December 16 – John Abercrombie, jazz guitarist (died 2017)
December 19
William Christie, harpsichordist and conductor
Alvin Lee, guitarist and singer (Ten Years After) (died 2013)
María Martha Serra Lima, ballad and bolero singer (died 2017)
Zal Yanovsky, guitarist and singer (The Lovin' Spoonful) (died 2002)
December 20 – Bobby Colomby, drummer (Blood, Sweat & Tears)
December 21 – Michael Tilson Thomas, conductor
December 22 – Barry Jenkins, drummer (The Animals)
December 25 – Henry Vestine, guitarist (Canned Heat) (died 1997)
December 27 – Mick Jones, guitarist, songwriter and record producer (Foreigner)

Deaths
January 9 – Johanna Beyer, pianist and composer (born 1888)
January 25 – Luise Greger, pianist and composer (born 1862)
January 29 – Carl Aeschbacher, choirmaster and composer (born 1886)
February 4 – Yvette Guilbert, cabaret singer and actress (born 1865)
February 7 – Lina Cavalieri, opera singer (born 1874)
April 4 – Alma Rosé, violinist and composer (born 1906) (food poisoning or typhoid at Auschwitz concentration camp)
April 13 – Cécile Chaminade, composer and pianist (born 1857)
April 19 – Jimmie Noone, jazz musician (born 1895)
April 23 – Marion Harris, jazz singer (born 1896) (hotel fire)
May 6 – Carl Engel, composer (born 1883)
May 9 – Dame Ethel Smyth, composer (born 1858)
May 16 – Leone Sinigaglia, composer (born 1868)
May 20 – Vincent Rose, Italian-born US bandleader and composer (born 1880)
June 2 – Zikmund Schul, composer (born 1916) (tuberculosis)
June 5 – Riccardo Zandonai, opera composer (born 1883)
June 10 – Sylvio Lazzari, composer (born 1857)
June 25 – Lucha Reyes (Mexican singer) (born 1906) (suicide)
July 4 – Alice Burville, singer and actress (born 1856)
July 14 – Asmahan, Syrian singer and actress (born 1912) (drowned)
July 19 – Will Marion Cook, violinist and composer (born 1869)
August 1 – Cecil Mack, songwriter and music publisher (born 1883)
August 7 – Agustin Barrios, composer (born 1885)
August 8 – Aino Ackté, operatic soprano (born 1876)
August 12 – James Simon, pianist, composer and musicologist (born 1880) (killed at Auschwitz concentration camp)
August 19 – Sir Henry Wood, conductor (born 1869)
October 1 – Carlo Sigmund Taube, pianist, conductor and composer (born 1897) (killed at Auschwitz concentration camp)
October 16 – Hans Krása, Czech-German composer (born 1899) (gassed in Auschwitz)
October 17 – Pavel Haas, Czech composer (born 1899) (gassed in Auschwitz)
October 18 – Orville "Hoppy" Jones, bass singer and cellist of The Ink Spots (born 1905) (dies in New York City)
November 14 – Carl Flesch, violinist (born 1873)
November 26 – Florence Foster Jenkins, soprano famous for her lack of musical ability (born 1868)
November 27 – Margarete Dessoff, conductor, singer and voice teacher (born 1874)
November 30 – Antoine Mariotte, conductor and composer (born 1875)
December 2 – Josef Lhévinne, pianist (born 1874)
December 15 – Glenn Miller, trombonist, composer and bandleader (born 1904) (missing in action)
December 27 – Amy Beach, composer and pianist (born 1867)
date unknown – Lalla Miranda, coloratura soprano (born 1874)

References

 
20th century in music
Music by year